The IMOCA 60 Class yacht Paprec-Virbac 2 was designed by Farr Yacht Design and launched in 2007 after being assembled by Southern Ocean Marine based in New Zealand the boat was then shipped to France before being launched. The boat is a sistership to Gitana 80 also built by the same builder from the same moulds.

Racing results

References 

Individual sailing yachts
2000s sailing yachts
Sailing yachts designed by Farr Yacht Design
Vendée Globe boats
IMOCA 60
Sailboat types built in New Zealand
Southern Ocean Marine